The 2002 Ballon d'Or, given to the best football player in Europe as judged by a panel of sports journalists from UEFA member countries, was awarded to Ronaldo on 12 December 2002. This was Ronaldo's second Ballon d'Or, his first award was in 1997.

Ronaldo was the first Brazilian national to win the award, when he won his first Ballon in 1997, since then Rivaldo had also won the award in 1999. He was also the fourth Real Madrid player to win the trophy after Alfredo Di Stéfano (1957, 1959), Raymond Kopa (1958), and Luís Figo (2000).

Rankings

Additionally, 24 players were nominated but received no votes: Pablo Aimar (Valencia), Sonny Anderson (Lyon), David Beckham (Manchester United), Iker Casillas (Real Madrid), Djibril Cissé (Auxerre), Edmílson (Lyon), Ryan Giggs (Manchester United), Junichi Inamoto (Arsenal, Fulham), Miroslav Klose (1. FC Kaiserslautern), Patrick Kluivert (Barcelona), Luis Enrique (Barcelona), Claude Makélélé (Real Madrid), Paolo Maldini (Milan), Pauleta (Bordeaux), Tomáš Rosický (Borussia Dortmund), Javier Saviola (Barcelona), Seol Ki-hyeon (Anderlecht), Jon Dahl Tomasson (Feyenoord, Milan), Francesco Totti (Roma), David Trezeguet (Juventus), Pierre van Hooijdonk (Feyenoord), Christian Vieri (Internazionale), Marc Wilmots (Bordeaux) and Sylvain Wiltord (Arsenal).

Notes

References

External links
 France Football Official Ballon d'Or page

2002
2002–03 in European football